SS William B. Woods was a Liberty ship built in the United States during World War II. Named after William B. Woods, an Associate Justice of the Supreme Court of the United States and a member of the Ohio General Assembly.

Construction
William B. Woods was laid down on 21 July 1942, under a Maritime Commission (MARCOM) contract, MC hull 1490, by J.A. Jones Construction, Brunswick, Georgia; sponsored by Mrs.Emil J.Kratt, and launched on 7 April 1943.

History
She was allocated to A. H. Bull & Company, Inc. on 31 May 1943. On 10 March 1944, she was torpedoed and sunk by the  near Palermo, Italy, with the loss of one US Navy Armed Guard and fifty-one US Army personnel.

References

Bibliography

 
 
 
 
 

 

Liberty ships
Ships built in Brunswick, Georgia
1943 ships
Ships sunk by German submarines in World War II
Maritime incidents in March 1944
World War II shipwrecks in the Mediterranean Sea